Kerrie  is a locality in the Macedon Ranges region of Victoria, Australia, featuring a town hall (1934) and the closed Kerrie State School (c. 1877). The school was closed in 1991, but remains an important venue for community meetings and events. The buildings and grounds are heritage listed and underwent external restoration during 2009–2010. Near the hall are the former tennis courts, now overgrown and in a state of disrepair.

The Kerrie Valley is the source of domestic water for the nearby town of Romsey. The catchment reservoir consists of a dam on a tributary of the Bolinda Creek.

Kerrie Post Office opened on 10 July 1891 and closed in 1949.

References

Towns in Victoria (Australia)
Shire of Macedon Ranges